Angophora bakeri subsp. crassifolia is a small, shrubby tree or mallee that is endemic to a small area of New South Wales. It has rough bark on the trunk and branches, thick, rigid lance-shaped leaves, flower buds in groups of three or seven, white or creamy white flowers and cup-shaped to barrel-shaped fruit. It is similar to subspecies bakeri, differing in its smaller habit, thick leaves and slightly larger fruit.

Description
It has rough, fibrous bark on the trunk and branches.

Subspecies crassifolia differs from subsp. bakeri in its smaller habit, thicker, less flexible leaves and slightly larger fruit.

Taxonomy and naming
Angophora bakeri was first formally described in 1913 by Edwin Cuthbert Hall and in 1986 Gregory John Leach described two subspecies in the journal Telopea, including subspecies crassifolia. The original specimens were collected by Leach near Mona Vale Road, Terrey Hills in 1975. The epithet (crassifolia) is from the Latin crassus meaning "thick" and folium meaning "leaf".

Distribution and habitat
Subspecies crassifolia grows in sandy soil over sandstone north from near Middle Harbour to Ku-ring-gai Chase National Park. The distribution of this subspecies is not known to overlap that of subsp. bakeri.

References

bakeri
Flora of New South Wales
Trees of Australia
Plants described in 1986